Noel Jammal Fernández, better known as Noel Jammal (in Arabic نويل جمّال, born 3 March 1990 in Madrid) is a Lebanese-Spanish Formula 3 driver who is in Cedars Motorsport group founded by his father Youssef Jammal and he regularly represents in international competition.

Noel Jammal was a karting enthusiast at an early age. On his 18th birthday, he asked his parents to give him a test drive on a racing car as a gift. He did very well, after which his family financed his endeavour in professional car racing. At nineteen, he became champion for Madrid City and then made his participation in an official circuit racing championship in 2009. His first win and gold trophy was at the Jerez circuit of the European Formula 3 Open Championship in Spain in 2011.

In 2011, he was picked as ambassador for Lebanese public awareness campaign Kunhadi (Be calm), promoting safe driving among Lebanese youth.

References

External links

1990 births
Living people
Spanish people of Lebanese descent
Sportspeople of Lebanese descent
Lebanese racing drivers
Euroformula Open Championship drivers
MRF Challenge Formula 2000 Championship drivers
De Villota Motorsport drivers